Jason Kristal (born on 1979) is an American weightlifter and professional strongman athlete who was placed first in 2008 America's Strongest Man.

References

American powerlifters
American male weightlifters
American strength athletes
1979 births
Living people
20th-century American people
21st-century American people